James Alexander Begg (14 February 1930 – 10 April 1987) was a Scottish professional footballer who played as a goalkeeper for Bradford (Park Avenue).

References

1930 births
1987 deaths
Footballers from Dumfries
Scottish footballers
Auchinleck Talbot F.C. players
Liverpool F.C. players
Bradford (Park Avenue) A.F.C. players
Association football goalkeepers
English Football League players